Central City Value High School or CCVHS is an alternative charter high school of the Los Angeles Unified School District located in Koreatown, central Los Angeles, California .

The school offers a high school education to students, in grades 9–12.

References

 Valueschools.com: "Five Core Values"

Los Angeles Unified School District schools
Charter high schools in California
High schools in Los Angeles
Koreatown, Los Angeles